is a kilometer-length near-Earth asteroid and potentially hazardous asteroid of the Apollo group. It was discovered by LINEAR on 13 January 1999.

During the close approach, it should peak at about apparent magnitude 7.3, and will be visible in binoculars.

 has a well-determined orbit with an observation arc of 65 years. It was found by Andreas Doppler and Arno Gnädig in precovery images from 1955. When astronomers had an observation arc of the object of 123 days, computations gave a 1 in 10 million chance it would return on an impact trajectory in 2039.

On 7 August 1946, the asteroid passed  from Earth and then  from the Moon.

See also 

Asteroid impact prediction
Earth-grazing fireball
List of asteroid close approaches to Earth

References

External links 
 
 
 

137108
137108
137108
19990113